Theodore is an electoral district of the Legislative Assembly in the Australian state of Queensland. It was created in the 2017 redistribution, and was won at the 2017 election by Mark Boothman. It is named after former Queensland Premier, Ted Theodore. From results of the most recent election, Theodore is a marginal seat for the Liberal National Party with a margin of 3.7%.

Geography 
Located on the Gold Coast, taking in parts of the abolished district of Albert, Theodore consists of the suburbs (whole or in part) of Coomera, Upper Coomera, Oxenford, Helensvale, Maudsland, Wongawallan, Pacific Pines, Guanaba,  Clagiraba and Mount Nathan.

Members for Theodore

Election results

See also
 Electoral districts of Queensland
 Members of the Queensland Legislative Assembly by year
 :Category:Members of the Queensland Legislative Assembly by name

References

2017 establishments in Australia
Electoral districts of Queensland
Constituencies established in 2017